Alosterna is a genus of beetles belonging to the family Cerambycidae.

The genus was described in 1863 by Étienne Mulsant.

The genus has cosmopolitan distribution.

Species:
 Alosterna anatolica Adlbauer, 1992
 Alosterna bicoloripes Pic, 1914
 Alosterna erythropus (Gebler, 1841)
 Alosterna ingrica***
 Alosterna pauli Pesarini, Rapuzzi & Sabbadini, 2004
 Alosterna perpera Danilevsky, 1988
 Alosterna scapularis Heyden, 1878
 Alosterna tabacicolor'' Degeer, 1775

References

Cerambycidae